Fabiano is both a given name and a surname. Notable people with the name include:

Given name
Fabian (entertainer), real name Fabiano Anthony Forte, American singer and entertainer 
Fabiano (footballer, born 1975), full name Fabiano Cezar Viegas, Brazilian football centre-back 
Fabiano Caruana (born 1992), Italian-American chess Grandmaster
Fabiano de Lima Campos Maria (born 1985), Brazilian footballer
Fabiano de Paula (born 1988), Brazilian professional tennis player
Fabiano Iha (born 1970), retired Brazilian mixed martial artist
Fabiano Joseph Naasi (born 1985), Tanzanian long-distance runner
Fabiano Lima Rodrigues (born 1979), Brazilian footballer
Fabiano Machado (born 1986), Brazilian professional racing driver
Fabiano Peçanha (born 1982), Brazilian middle distance runner
Fabiano Pereira (born 1978), Brazilian footballer
Fabinho Recife (born 1982), Brazilian footballer, real name Fabiano Aguiar Dionizio Laurentino
Fabiano Silveira (born 1974), Brazilian lawyer and politician
Fabiano (footballer, born 1982), Fabiano Medina da Silva, Brazilian midfielder
Fabiano (footballer, born 1983), Francisco Fabiano Pereira Marciano, Brazilian defender
Fabiano (footballer, born 1984), Fabiano Vieira Soares, Brazilian striker
Fabiano (footballer, born 1990), Fabiano da Silva Souza, Brazilian left back
Fabiano (footballer, born 2000), Fabiano Josué de Souza Silva, Brazilian right back

Surname
Anthony Fabiano (born 1993), American football center for the Indianapolis Colts
Fabien Fabiano (1882–1962), French illustrator, portrait painter, and designer
Gerard Fabiano (born 1983), American Magic: The Gathering player
Luís Fabiano (born 1980), Brazilian footballer
Michael Fabiano (born 1984), American opera singer
Ney Fabiano (born 1979), Brazilian footballer
Nicolas Fabiano (born 1981), French footballer
Wagnney Fabiano (born 1975), Brazilian mixed martial artist